Emilio Estevez (born May 12, 1962) is an American actor and filmmaker.

He is the son of actor Martin Sheen and the older brother of Charlie Sheen. Estevez started his acting career in the 1980s and was a member of the acting troupe the Brat Pack. He is notable for starring in The Outsiders (1983), The Breakfast Club (1985), and Wisdom (1986). He is also known for appearing in Men at Work (1990), Freejack (1992), Loaded Weapon 1 (1993), Mission: Impossible (1996), Rated X (2000), and Bobby (2006) (which he also wrote and directed). Estevez also starred in two film franchises: Young Guns (1988) and its 1990 sequel, and The Mighty Ducks (1992–1996; 2021).

Early life
Estevez was born on Staten Island, the oldest child of artist Janet Sheen and actor Martin Sheen (legally Ramón Estévez). His siblings are Ramon Estevez, Charlie Sheen (born Carlos Estévez), and Renée Estevez. Estevez's paternal grandparents were Irish and Spanish immigrants. His father is a "devout Catholic" and his mother is a "strict Southern Baptist."

Estevez initially attended school in the New York City public school system but transferred to a private academy once his father's career took off. He lived on Manhattan's Upper West Side until his family moved west in 1968 when his father was cast in Catch-22. Growing up in Malibu, California, Estevez attended Santa Monica High School.

When Estevez was 11 years old, his father bought the family a portable movie camera. Estevez also appeared in Meet Mr. Bomb, a short anti-nuclear power film produced at his high school. Estevez was 14 when he accompanied his father to the Philippines, where Sheen was shooting Apocalypse Now. Estevez had a role as an extra in Apocalypse Now, but his scenes were deleted.

When they returned to Los Angeles, Estevez co-wrote and starred in a high school play about Vietnam veterans called Echoes of an Era and invited his parents to watch it. Sheen recalls being astonished by his son's performance, and "began to realize: my God, he's one of us." After graduating from Santa Monica High in 1980, he refused to go to college and instead went into acting. Unlike his brother Charlie, Estevez and his other siblings did not adopt their father's stage name. Emilio reportedly liked the alliteration of the double 'E' initials, and "didn't want to ride into the business as 'Martin Sheen's son'." Upon his brother's using his birth name Carlos Estevez for the film Machete Kills, Estevez mentioned that he was proud of his Spanish heritage and was glad that he never adopted a stage name, taking advice from his father who regretted adopting the name Martin Sheen as opposed to using his birth name, Ramón Estévez.

Career
His first role was in a drama produced by the Catholic Paulist order. Soon after, he made his stage debut with his father in Mister Roberts at Burt Reynolds' dinner theater in Jupiter, Florida (this was the only job his father ever placed him in). Later, father and son worked together in the 1982 ABC-TV film about juveniles in jail, In the Custody of Strangers, in which Estevez did the casting.

Brat Pack years
Estevez received much attention during the 1980s for being a member of the Brat Pack and was credited as the leader of the group of young actors. Estevez and Rob Lowe established the Brat Pack when cast as supporting "Greasers" in an early Brat Pack movie, The Outsiders based on the novel. Lowe was cast as C. Thomas Howell's older brother Sodapop and Estévez as Two-Bit Mathews. During production, he approached his character as a laid-back guy and thought up Two-Bit's interest in Mickey Mouse, shown by his uniform of Mickey Mouse T-shirts and watching of cartoons.

Besides his roles in In the Custody of Strangers and The Outsiders, his credits include NBC-TV's thrillers Nightmares and Tex, the 1982 film version of another S.E. Hinton story. He bought the movie rights to a third Hinton book, That Was Then, This Is Now, and wrote the screenplay. His father predicted he would have to direct to feel the full extent of his talents, describing him as "an officer, not a soldier."

After The Outsiders, Estevez appeared as the punk-rocker turned car-repossessor Otto Maddox in the film Repo Man before co-starring in The Breakfast Club and St. Elmo's Fire. Following the success of these back-to-back Brat Pack films, he starred in That Was Then, This Is Now (which he co-wrote), the horror film Maximum Overdrive (for which he was nominated for a Golden Raspberry Award), and the crime drama Wisdom (with fellow Brat Packer Demi Moore). Estevez was originally cast in Platoon to be Private Chris Taylor but was forced to drop out after production was delayed for two years; the role eventually went to his younger brother Charlie Sheen. He went on to lead roles in the comedy/action film Stakeout and the westerns Young Guns and Young Guns II.

1990–present
In the early 1990s, Estevez directed, wrote, and starred with his brother Charlie in a comedy about garbagemen, Men at Work. Estevez later stated, "People come up to me on the street and say, Men at Work is the funniest movie I ever saw in my life. But, you know, I do have to question how many movies these people have seen."

In 1992, he found the career longevity that escaped other Brat Packers by starring in The Mighty Ducks as Coach Gordon Bombay, a lawyer and former pee wee star and minor hockey prodigy looking to forget the past, forced into coaching a pee wee hockey team as a form of community service. The film turned out to be one of Disney's most successful franchises. It was followed by two sequels. The following year Estevez starred in three films: the dark thriller Judgment Night, the spoof comedy Loaded Weapon 1 in which his brother Charlie Sheen has a cameo, and comedy/action film Another Stakeout, which was the sequel to his earlier film Stakeout.

Estevez has acted alongside his father several times. He starred in (and directed) the 1996 The War at Home in which he played a Vietnam War veteran dealing with posttraumatic stress disorder, while Martin Sheen played his unsympathetic father.

Estevez appeared in an uncredited role in the feature film Mission: Impossible. From 1998 to 1999, he appeared in three television films: the spaghetti Western Dollar for the Dead (1998), the comedy Late Last Night (1999), and Rated X (2000), which he directed. In 2000, Estevez starred in the Moxie! Award-winning thriller Sand as part of an ensemble cast that also included Denis Leary, Jon Lovitz, Harry Dean Stanton, and Julie Delpy.

In 2003, he made his voice acting debut when he helped create the English dubbed version of The 3 Wise Men with his father. Later, Estevez starred in The L.A. Riot Spectacular and voiced the English version of the film Arthur and the Invisibles. In 2008, he guest-starred on his brother's sitcom Two and a Half Men as an old friend of Charlie Sheen's character. (His father Martin Sheen had also guest-starred in 2005.)

In an interview a month after the 2010 Oscar tribute to John Hughes he explained his absence as publicity shyness: "I've never been a guy that went out there to get publicity on myself. I never saw the value in it."

In 2017, his appearance in films was found to generate the highest return on investment (ROI) on average of all Hollywood actors.

Estevez reprised his role as Coach Gordon Bombay in the 2021 Disney+ TV series, The Mighty Ducks: Game Changers.  It was reported in November 2021 that Estevez would not return in the show's second season due to a contract dispute and creative differences.

Directing career
Aside from acting, Estevez has also directed television shows and motion pictures. He made his directorial debut with the 1986 film Wisdom, which made Estevez the youngest person to ever write, direct, and star in, a single major motion picture. Most recently, he has directed episodes of the television series Cold Case, Close to Home, The Guardian, CSI: NY and Numb3rs. The films he has directed include Men at Work and The War at Home.

He directed the 2006 film Bobby, which took over six years to write. Producing the film nearly bankrupted him as the domestic box office gross was not able to cover production costs. The movie scored him some fans outside of the US, mainly in Europe. He won a Hollywood Film Award and received a seven-minute standing ovation at the Venice Film Festival.

In 2010 Estevez filmed a new project, The Way, in Spain where he directed his father in a story about a man who decides to make the Camino de Santiago after the death of his son in the French Pyrénées. It was released in the United States on October 7, 2011.

In 2018, Estevez released another feature film, The Public, starring Alec Baldwin, Christian Slater, Jena Malone and Estevez himself. He wrote, directed and played in The Public that world premiered at the Toronto Film Festival.

Music videos
Estevez appeared in John Parr's "St. Elmo's Fire (Man in Motion)" music video, from the soundtrack of his film with the same name, where he played Kirby Keger. The music video featured all seven of the main cast members of the film, looking sadly through the foggy windows of a run-down and fire-damaged version of the St. Elmo's Bar set.

Estevez is a close friend of Jon Bon Jovi. He appeared in Bon Jovi's music video "Blaze of Glory" as Billy the Kid. In turn, Bon Jovi made a cameo appearance in Young Guns II. "Blaze of Glory" was in the Young Guns II soundtrack and was nominated for an Academy Award. In 2000, Estevez made an appearance in another Bon Jovi video, "Say It Isn't So," along with Matt LeBlanc, Claudia Schiffer, and Arnold Schwarzenegger.

Personal life
In the early 1980s, Estevez dated actress Mimi Rogers. He was involved off and on with Carey Salley, a Wilhelmina model. They have a son, Taylor Levi Estevez (born June 22, 1984), and a daughter, Paloma Rae Estevez (born February 15, 1986). Estevez and Salley did not issue a press release announcing either of their children's births; the relationship overlapped with Estevez's high-profile engagement to Demi Moore, who he was with intermittently from 1984 to 1986. In 1987, Salley filed a $2 million paternity suit against Estevez. Estevez acknowledged paternity of Salley's children on June 1, 1987.

On April 29, 1992, Estevez married singer-choreographer Paula Abdul. They divorced in May 1994, with Abdul later stating that the reason for the divorce was that she wanted children while Estevez, who already had two children, did not.

Estevez has stated that his religion is a "work in progress". He revealed on his official Twitter that he is a supporter of Ipswich Town Football Club.

In November 2021, Estevez revealed that he tested positive for COVID-19 in March 2020, and that he suffered from Long COVID while filming The Mighty Ducks: Game Changers in summer and fall of 2020.

Filmography

Film

Television

Awards and nominations

See also
List of celebrities who own wineries and vineyards

References

External links

 

|-
! colspan="3" style="background: #DAA520;" | Bronze Wrangler Awards
|-

1962 births
Living people
20th-century American male actors
21st-century American male actors
Activists from California
Activists from New York City
American environmentalists
American film producers
American male film actors
American male screenwriters
American male television actors
American people of English descent
American people of Galician descent
American people of Irish descent
American people of Scottish descent
American film directors
American television directors
Estevez family
Film directors from California
Film directors from New York (state)
Hispanic and Latino American male actors
Male actors from Malibu, California
Male actors from New York City
People from St. George, Staten Island
People from the Upper West Side
People named in the Panama Papers
Screenwriters from California
Screenwriters from New York (state)